Christian Andreas Barreiro (born December 14, 1990) is an American soccer player who most recently played for Puerto Rico Islanders in the North American Soccer League.

Career

College and Amateur
Barreiro spent all four years of his collegiate career at the University of Pennsylvania.  In 2008, he was one of only two freshman to start all 18 games for the Quakers.  He finished the year with two goals and one assist.  In 2009, Barreiro made 17 appearances and led the Quakers with 15 points.  He finished tied for the team lead with six goals and also recorded three assists.  In 2010, Barreiro started all 19 games for Penn and tallied five goals, including a Golden Goal against Bucknell in the first round of the NCAA Tournament, and seven assists.  He went on to be named First-team All-Ivy and Third-team NSCAA All-Northeast Region.  In his final year at the University of Pennsylvania in 2011, Barreiro led the Quakers in goals, assists and points.  He made 17 appearances that year and tallied seven goals and seven assists, giving him 21 points.  He was also named First-team All-Ivy for the second straight year as well as Second-team NSCAA All-Northeast Region and Academic All-Ivy.

Barreiro also spent the 2011 season with Reading United in the USL Premier Development League.

Professional
On January 17, 2012, Barreiro was drafted in the third round (50th overall) of the 2012 MLS Supplemental Draft by New York Red Bulls.  However, he was cut from preseason camp in early February.  He then joined PDL club Baltimore Bohemians where he made 13 appearances and scored three goals on his way to being named to the 2012 PDL All-Eastern Conference Team.

Shortly after the conclusion of the PDL season, Barreiro signed a professional contract with NASL side Puerto Rico Islanders.  He made his professional debut on August 12 in a 1–0 defeat to FC Edmonton. He made two more appearances for the Islanders before the club announced that they would suspend all operations because of budget issues.

References

External links
University of Pennsylvania bio

1990 births
Living people
American expatriate soccer players
American soccer players
Association football midfielders
Baltimore Bohemians players
Expatriate footballers in Puerto Rico
New York Red Bulls draft picks
North American Soccer League players
Penn Quakers men's soccer players
Puerto Rico Islanders players
Reading United A.C. players
Soccer players from Baltimore
USL League Two players